Gary Colling (born 17 March 1950) is a former Australian rules footballer who played for St Kilda from 1968 until 1981 in the Victorian Football League (VFL). 

Colling played 265 VFL games for the Saints after being recruited from Frankston. A defender, he was St Kilda captain in 1978. 

After retiring from football Colling held a number of positions at St Kilda; he coached the reserves team and was also football manager. He is still an active member of the Saints' past players and officials group.

References

External links
 
 

1950 births
Australian rules footballers from Victoria (Australia)
St Kilda Football Club players
People educated at Mentone Grammar School
Frankston Bombers players
Living people